Shekar Ab or Shakar Ab or Shekarab or Shokrab may refer to:
 Shakar Ab, Ardabil
 Shokrab, Kermanshah
 Shekar Ab, Lali, Khuzestan Province
 Shekar Ab, Masjed Soleyman, Khuzestan Province
 Shekar Ab, South Khorasan